Warspite may refer to:

 Warspite, Alberta, Canada; a hamlet
 Mount Warspite, mountain summit located in Peter Lougheed Provincial Park
 , a British Royal Navy ship name
 , a ship in the Tudor Dynasty English Navy
 Warspite (schooner), a transport schooner in the Anguilla trade, see Sailing in Anguilla
 Warspite (locomotive), #8 engine for the National Coal Board, s/n 3776, see List of preserved Hunslet Austerity 0-6-0ST locomotives

See also

 
 War (disambiguation)
 Spite (disambiguation)